Soldier of Fortune is a 1997 compilation by Eric Burdon. While it features hits such as "Power Company" and "House of the Rising Sun", it also features a few previously unreleased songs.

When this compilation released, the original version of "Wicked Man" was retitled "I'm a Wicked Man" while the later released "slow" version had the name of the original. This compilation features the slow version.

This was also the first official album that featured the song "Ghetto Child", both studio and live version.

Track listing 

 "Heart Attack"
 "Power Company"
 "Highway Mover"
 "Wicked Man"
 "Ghetto Child"
 "Portrait Of A Soldier"
 "Devil's Daughter"
 "Comeback"
 "You Can't Kill My Spirit"
 "Yes Indeed, Yeah"
 "House Of The Rising Sun"
 "Ghetto Child" (Reprise, Live)

1997 compilation albums
Eric Burdon albums